Michael David Jones (born 23 July 1963 in London, Greater London) is a male retired English athlete who competed in the hammer throw.

Athletics career
Jones competed in the 1988 Summer Olympics finishing in 22nd place.

He appeared at five Commonwealth Games. He represented England at the 1986 Commonwealth Games in Edinburgh, Scotland and eight years later represented England, at the 1994 Commonwealth Games in Victoria, British Columbia, Canada. A third games appearance ensued representing England, at the 1998 Commonwealth Games in Kuala Lumpur, Malaysia, where he won a silver medal in the hammer. Four years later he won the gold medal at the 2002 Commonwealth Games in Manchester, beating New Zealand's Philip Jensen before finishing in fifth place at the 2006 Commonwealth Games.

Jones competed in British athletics for over 20 years and captained the Great Britain team to victories in the European Cup. He is the all-time fourth-farthest British thrower in the hammer.

Achievements

References

External links
 
 

1963 births
Living people
English male hammer throwers
British male hammer throwers
Athletes (track and field) at the 1988 Summer Olympics
Athletes (track and field) at the 1986 Commonwealth Games
Athletes (track and field) at the 1994 Commonwealth Games
Athletes (track and field) at the 1998 Commonwealth Games
Athletes (track and field) at the 2002 Commonwealth Games
Athletes (track and field) at the 2006 Commonwealth Games
Commonwealth Games gold medallists for England
Commonwealth Games silver medallists for England
Athletes from London
Commonwealth Games medallists in athletics
Olympic athletes of Great Britain
Medallists at the 1998 Commonwealth Games
Medallists at the 2002 Commonwealth Games